The Howard Bison men's soccer team is a varsity intercollegiate athletic team of Howard University in Washington, D.C., United States. The team is an associate member of the Northeast Conference, which is part of the National Collegiate Athletic Association's Division I. Howard's first men's soccer team was fielded in 1965. The team plays its home games at Greene Stadium near the Park View neighborhood of the District. The Bison are coached by Howard alumnus and former U.S. national team player, Phillip Gyau.

Howard achieved much of their success in the early to mid-1970s and in the late 1980s, where they would win two NCAA Division I Men's Soccer Championships (1971 and 1974), and reach the College Cup on six occasions. The 1971 title would later be vacated by the NCAA. Howard is the first historically black university to win an NCAA soccer title (or any Division I national title). Despite these achievements, the Bison have had less success in modern times, with their last NCAA berth coming in 1997.

Roster 
The 2021-2022 roster for the Howard Men's Bison.

Notable alumni 
Howard Bison's that have played professionally include.

Individual achievements 
Howard has produced five first team All-Americans.

References

External links 
 

 
1965 establishments in Washington, D.C.
Association football clubs established in 1965